Local elections in Tacloban City, Leyte were held on May 13, 2019 within the Philippine general election. The voters elected candidates for the elective local posts in the city: the mayor, vice mayor, and ten councilors.

There were 139,423 eligible voters in the city for this election, and there were 105,704 votes cast, giving a voter turnout of 75.82%.

Background
Incumbent Mayor Cristina Romualdez of the Nacionalista Party decided not to run for a second consecutive term in this election. Her husband, former Mayor Alfred Romualdez, was her party's nominee for the mayoralty post. No one filed their Certificate of Candidacy to oppose Romualdez. As such, he ran unopposed.

Incumbent Vice-Mayor Jerry Yaokasin ran as an independent for his third and final term as Vice-Mayor. He also ran unopposed.

Results
The candidates for mayor and vice mayor with the highest number of votes wins the seat; they are voted separately, therefore, they may be of different parties when elected.

Mayoral Election
Parties are as stated in their certificate of candidacies.

Vice Mayoral Election
Parties are as stated in their certificate of candidacies. Jerry Yaokasin is the incumbent.

City Council Election
Voters elected ten councilors to comprise the City Council or the Sangguniang Panlungsod. Candidates are voted for separately so winning candidates may come from different political parties. The ten candidates with the highest number of votes win the seats. For the tickets, names that are italicized were incumbents seeking reelection.

Team Romualdez

 

|-bgcolor=black
|colspan=5|

References

External links
 Official website of the Commission on Elections
 Official website of the Parish Pastoral Council for Responsible Voting (PPCRV)

2019 Philippine local elections
Elections in Leyte (province)
Tacloban
May 2019 events in the Philippines